Garth Mullins is a Canadian radio producer, activist, methadone user, and musician. He is the host of the Crackdown podcast and a board member of Vancouver Area Network of Drug Users.

His podcast won the The Canadian Hillman Prize in 2020.

Early life 
Mullins grew up in Yellowknife, Northwest Territories in the 1970s. 

He was bullied in school about his albinism. During high school he worked in banking and construction; after high school he worked in a mine in Northwest Territories. Being blind was a barrier to employment opportunities, prompting him to return to studies at the University of Victoria. While studying, he hosted a radio show called The War Measures Act and took heroin for the first time at the age of 19. After graduating from the University of Victoria, he studied political sociology at the London School of Economics, while writing articles for the Vancouver Sun.

Later life and views 
Mullins has hosted the monthly Crackdown podcast since 2019. His team won the The Canadian Hillman Prize in 2020.

A previous intravenous user of heroin, Mullins is a user of methadone. He speaks about his own use of drugs on the Crackdown podcast hoping to inprove public education. He serves on the board of directors of the Vancouver Area Network of Drug Users. Mullins describes how he sees the war on drugs as still affecting people in contemporary times. He is an advocate for the legalisation of street drugs, and has campaigned against the planned expansion in scope of Canada's Medical Assistance in Dying permissibility to include people with disabilities.

Mullins performs as a musician in the band Legally Blind.

References

External links 
 Official website

Year of birth missing (living people)
Living people
University of Victoria alumni
Alumni of the London School of Economics
People from Yellowknife
Journalists from British Columbia
People from Vancouver
Canadian podcasts
Activists from British Columbia
Canadian disability rights activists
Canadian health activists
Canadian human rights activists
Canadian blind people
People with albinism
Drug policy reform activists